Geoff Dupuy (born 31 January 1937) is a former  Australian rules footballer who played with Hawthorn in the Victorian Football League (VFL).

Dupey was recruited from Rochester in the Bendigo Football League in 1955.

Notes

External links 

Living people
1937 births
Australian rules footballers from Victoria (Australia)
Hawthorn Football Club players
Rochester Football Club players